The Economic Research Center is a policy-research oriented nonprofit think tank founded in 2000 that strives to facilitate sustainable economic development and good governance in the New Public Management system of Azerbaijan. ERC is the only NGO in Azerbaijan receiving support grant for establishment of institutional support.

References

External links 
 ERC Homepage

Think tanks based in Azerbaijan
2000 establishments in Azerbaijan
Research institutes established in 2000
Research institutes in Azerbaijan
Economy of Azerbaijan